Scott Clendenin (January 17, 1968 – March 24, 2015) was an American musician most notable for his time spent in the bands Death and Control Denied, both of which were formed by Chuck Schuldiner. Following Schuldiner's passing, Death disbanded, which left the members to go about their own paths, with Clendenin being the only member to retire for the time being. In 2012, he came out of retirement to play for Death to All, former members of Death paying tribute to Schuldiner, as well as members of Cynic, Intronaut, Abysmal Dawn, and Exhumed. Clendenin died on March 24, 2015, with former bandmates and Death's manager Eric Greif expressing their shock and sympathy.

History
Scott Clendenin was born in Titusville, Florida on January 17, 1968. Clendenin began his musical career in the band Talonzfury, which he created alongside Chris Williams on drums and Paul Payne on guitars. The three recorded an album together under the name and even attempted to hire Shannon Hamm, which did not work out. Shortly after that, Williams met Chuck Schuldiner at a party and played him a copy of the Talonzfury album, which led to Schuldiner hiring him, Hamm, and Clendenin as the original Control Denied lineup. Payne also tried out on vocals, however, this did not work out. However, not long after their induction, Williams departed from the band and was replaced by Richard Christy.

At this time, Death's record label was reaching out to Schuldiner to tell him to work on another album for Death in order to release the Control Denied album. With this in mind, Schuldiner hired the three members of Control Denied to record the new Death album alongside him. The band would record the album, which would be the seventh Death album, titled The Sound of Perseverance. The next year, Control Denied released their debut album, however, Clendenin had been replaced by former Death bassist Steve Di Giorgio, who played on the album The Fragile Art of Existence. Clendenin would, however, continue to perform with Death, even appearing on a live DVD titled Live in L.A. (Death & Raw). In 2001, Schuldiner died at the age of 34, which resulted in the disbanding of the band. Clendinen would seemingly retire from the music scene, likely grieving from the loss of Schuldiner, as well as Chris Williams who had died a year prior in 2000. In 2012, Clendenin came out of retirement to play on the Death to All tour, which featured himself and Di Giorgio on bass, Hamm, Paul Masvidal, and Bobby Koelble on guitars, and Sean Reinert and Gene Hoglan on drums. Following the tour, however, the band were informed of a conflict, which led to changing the name in August 2013 to Death: DTA. Clendenin would play in both the 2012 and 2013 tours with the band. Clendenin died on March 24, 2015 due to undisclosed reasons.

Bands
Former
Control Denied (1996-1999)
Death (1996-2001)
Death To All (2012-2013)
Talonzfury

Discography
Death
The Sound of Perseverance (1998)
Live in L.A. (Death & Raw) (2001)
Live in Eindhoven (2002)
Vivus! (2012)

Control Denied
Demo (1996)
A Moment of Clarity (1997)
The Fragile Art of Existence (1999; writing only)

Symbolic
The Ultimate Death Tribute (2010, tracks 4-6, 15-16, 21)

References

1968 births
2015 deaths
American heavy metal musicians
Death metal musicians
Death (metal band) members
Control Denied members